Domain adaptation is a field associated with machine learning and transfer learning. This scenario arises when we aim at learning from a source data distribution a well performing model on a different (but related) target data distribution. For instance, one of the tasks of the common spam filtering problem consists in adapting a model from one user (the source distribution) to a new user who receives significantly different emails (the target distribution). Domain adaptation has also been shown to be beneficial for learning unrelated sources.
Note that, when more than one source distribution is available the problem is referred to as multi-source domain adaptation.

Overview 
Domain adaptation is the ability to apply an algorithm trained in one or more "source domains" to a different (but related) "target domain". Domain adaptation is a subcategory of transfer learning. In domain adaptation, the source and target domains all have the same feature space (but different distributions); in contrast, transfer learning includes cases where the target domain's feature space is different from the source feature space or spaces.

Domain shift 
A domain shift, or distributional shift, is a change in the data distribution between an algorithm's training dataset, and a dataset it encounters when deployed. These domain shifts are common in practical applications of artificial intelligence. Conventional machine-learning algorithms often adapt poorly to domain shifts. The modern machine-learning community has many different strategies to attempt to gain better domain adaptation.

Examples 
 An algorithm trained on newswires might have to adapt to a new dataset of biomedical documents.
 A spam filter, trained on a certain group of email users during training, must adapt to a new target user when deployed.
 Applying AI diagnostic algorithms, trained on labeled data associated with previous diseases, to new unlabeled data associated with the COVID-19 pandemic.
 A sudden societal change, such as a pandemic outbreak, can constitute domain shift and cause machine learning algorithms trained on now-obsolete consumer data to fail and require intervention.

Other applications include wifi localization detection and many aspects of computer vision.

Formalization 
Let  be the input space (or description space) and let  be the output space (or label space). This model is learned from a learning sample .

Usually in supervised learning (without domain adaptation), we suppose that the examples  are drawn i.i.d. from a distribution  of support  (unknown and fixed). The objective is then to learn  (from ) such that it commits the least error possible for labelling new examples coming from the distribution .

The domain adaptation task then consists of the transfer of knowledge from the source domain  to the target one . The goal is then to learn  (from labeled or unlabelled samples coming from the two domains) such that it commits as little error as possible on the target domain .

The major issue is the following: if a model is learned from a source domain, what is its capacity to correctly label data coming from the target domain?

The different types of domain adaptation  
There are several contexts of domain adaptation. They differ in the information considered for the target task.
 The unsupervised domain adaptation: the learning sample contains a set of labeled source examples, a set of unlabeled source examples and a set of unlabeled target examples.
 The semi-supervised domain adaptation:  in this situation, we also consider a "small" set of labeled target examples. 
 The supervised domain adaptation: all the examples considered are supposed to be labeled.

Four algorithmic principles

Reweighting algorithms 
The objective is to reweight the source labeled sample such that it "looks like" the target sample (in terms of the error measure considered).

Iterative algorithms 
A method for adapting consists in iteratively "auto-labeling" the target examples. The principle is simple:
 a model  is learned from the labeled examples;
  automatically labels some target examples;
 a new model is learned from the new labeled examples. 
Note that there exist other iterative approaches, but they usually need target labeled examples.

Search of a common representation space 
The goal is to find or construct a common representation space for the two domains. The objective is to obtain a space in which the domains are close to each other while keeping good performances on the source labeling task.
This can be achieved through the use of Adversarial machine learning techniques where feature representations from samples in different domains are encouraged to be indistinguishable.

Hierarchical Bayesian Model 
The goal is to construct a Bayesian hierarchical model , which is essentially a factorization model for counts , to derive domain-dependent latent representations allowing both domain-specific and globally shared latent factors.

Softwares 

Several compilations of domain adaptation and transfer learning algorithms have been implemented over the past decades:
 ADAPT (Python)
 TLlib  (Python)
 Domain-Adaptation-Toolbox  (Matlab)

References 

Machine learning